The 1987–88 Segunda División B season was the 11th since its establishment. The first matches of the season were played on 29 August 1987, and the season ended in 22 May 1988.

Overview before the season
80 teams joined the league, including 63 promoted from the 1986–87 Tercera División after the expansion to four groups. No teams were relegated from the 1986–87 Segunda División. The composition of the groups was determined by the Royal Spanish Football Federation, attending to geographical criteria.

Group 1
Teams from Asturias, Basque Country, Cantabria, Castile and Leon and Galicia.

Teams

League table

Results

Top goalscorers

Top goalkeepers

Group 2
Teams from Andorra, Aragon, Basque Country, Balearic Islands, Castile and Leon, Catalonia, La Rioja and Navarre.

Teams

League table

Results

Top goalscorers

Top goalkeepers

Group 3
Teams from Andalusia, Canary Islands, Castile and Leon, Castilla–La Mancha, Extremadura and Madrid.

Teams

League table

Results

Top goalscorers

Top goalkeepers

Group 4
Teams from Andalusia, Aragon, Castilla–La Mancha, Ceuta, Melilla, Region of Murcia and Valencian Community.

Teams

League table

Results

Top goalscorers

Top goalkeepers

1987-88
3
Spain